Horace Stewart (29 May 1871 – 14 July 1951) was an Australian rules footballer who played with Essendon in the Victorian Football League (VFL).

Notes

External links 

1951 deaths
1871 births
Australian rules footballers from Tasmania
Essendon Football Club players